Retreat Hills is a group of hills at the south side of the head of Astronaut Glacier, along the south margin of Evans Neve. So named by the Northern Party of the New Zealand Geological Survey Antarctic Expedition (NZGSAE), 1962–63, which had hoped to visit the hills, but was forced to beat a hasty retreat due to blizzards.

See also
Mount Gobey

References

Hills of Victoria Land
Borchgrevink Coast